Abbas Khan (also Romanized as ʿAbbās Khān; also known as Meleh Gāv) is a village in Kashkan Rural District, Shahivand District, Dowreh County, Lorestan Province, Iran. At the 2006 census, its population was 190, in 40 families.

References 

Towns and villages in Dowreh County